Chicacao is a town and municipality in the Suchitepéquez department of Guatemala. It is situated at 600 metres above sea level. The town has a population of 26,309 (2018 census). Originally a German settlement, it is famous for a clock that is now over 100 years old.

References

External links
Muni in Spanish

Municipalities of the Suchitepéquez Department